Feels Like is the debut studio album by American rock band Bully, released on June 23, 2015 by Startime International and Columbia Records. The album was produced by Bully frontwoman Alicia Bognanno and recorded in 2014 at Electrical Audio in Chicago.

Critical reception

Feels Like received generally positive reviews from music critics. At Metacritic, which assigns a normalized rating out of 100 to reviews from professional publications, the album received an average score of 77, based on 19 reviews. In his review for NME, Robert Cooke highlighted Alicia Bognanno's "honest, witty" songwriting and stated that Feels Like "revels in the simplicity of a great pop song while cleverly articulating the everyday truths of 20-something life". Pitchforks Laura Snapes noted the contrast between the "explosive, rollicking" music and Bognanno's lyrics, which Snapes felt displayed an intimacy comparable to that of "Courtney Barnett or Waxahatchee's Katie Crutchfield". James Oldham of Q wrote that while Bully's heavy influence from 1990s alternative rock is apparent, the album "retains a thrilling freshness" due to Bognanno's "formidable presence", as well as her "taut, confessional" lyrics, whose directness he said complemented the music's "brutal succinctness".

Michael Hann of The Guardian was less enthusiastic, describing Feels Like as "a grab-bag of early-90s alt-rock styles that sounded tired by the mid-90s – and haven't got any fresher since."

Track listing

Personnel
Credits are adapted from the album's liner notes.

Bully
 Alicia Bognanno – vocals, guitar
 Stewart Copeland – drums
 Reece Lazarus – bass
 Clayton Parker – guitar

Production
 Alicia Bognanno – production, engineering, mixing
 John Golden – mastering
 Jon San Paolo – engineering

Design
 Daniel Topete – photography
 Esther Pearl Watson – cover photography

Charts

References

External links
 

2015 debut albums
Bully (band) albums
Startime International albums
Columbia Records albums